This article lists information of animated original characters from Disney's The Little Mermaid franchise, covering the 1989 film, its prequel , its direct-to-video sequel and prequel films, and the stage musical adaptation.

The Little Mermaid

Ariel

Ariel is the title character of the franchise. She is voiced by Jodi Benson and was designed by Glen Keane. Auliʻi Cravalho plays her in The Little Mermaid Live!. Ariel is the seventh-born and the youngest daughter of King Triton and the late Queen Athena of the merfolk, and over the course of the original film becomes human and marries Eric, a human prince. She is the only Disney Princess to reach parenthood in Disney's animated film canon. In The Little Mermaid II: Return to the Sea, Ariel is the mother of Melody, the film's protagonist. In the 2007 Broadway musical, the role of Ariel was originated by Sierra Boggess.

Prince Eric

Eric is based on the "prince" character of Hans Christian Andersen's 1837 fairy tale "The Little Mermaid," but was adapted by the writer-directors Ron Clements and John Musker for the film adaptation. According to the film's official novelization, Eric had just turned 18 in the film, which would make him two years older than Ariel. Eric is voiced by Christopher Daniel Barnes in the original film, Kingdom Hearts II, and Disney Dreamlight Valley, by Jeff Bennett in the prequel television series, and by Rob Paulsen in the direct-to-video sequel. Prince Eric is the only prince in the "Disney Princess" franchise not to sing in an original movie.

Eric is a human prince rescued by Ariel when he almost drowns in a storm at sea. She drags him to shore and sings to him, leaving Eric haunted by her voice. He searches the kingdom for her to no avail. When he crosses paths with Ariel again, he is unable to identify her, as she has given her voice to Ursula in exchange for legs. However, he brings her back to his palace and they spend time together. Eric develops feelings for Ariel, but before he can approach her about them, Ursula, disguised as a human girl named Vanessa, hypnotizes Eric, forcing him to forget about Ariel and believe that Vanessa is the one who saved his life. He nearly marries Vanessa, but Ariel and her friends intervene, breaking Ursula's spell and restoring Ariel's voice to her. Eric realizes that Ariel is the girl he has been looking for, but before they can kiss, the sun sets and Ursula claims Ariel. Eric dives into the sea to help Ariel, and in the battle that follows, climbs onto a ship and plows it into Ursula impaling her on the prow.

Eric makes cameo appearances in three episodes of the prequel television series: Thingamajigger (a non-speaking appearance) Scuttle and Ariel's Treasures.

In the 2000 direct-to-video sequel, Eric is a supporting character. Although he and Ariel are happily married, they are attacked by Ursula's sister Morgana, who wishes to avenge Ursula. He and Ariel raise their new daughter Melody away from the sea, keeping her mermaid heritage secret.

In the 2007 Broadway musical, the role of Eric was originated by Sean Palmer. It is explained through dialogue that Eric's father has died, and it is Grimsby's duty to help Eric find a bride so he can return to the throne properly, despite Eric's affinity for exploring the seas. Eric contributes singing vocals to the opening song "Fathoms Below", and performs two solo songs: "Her Voice", a song about Eric's obsession with Ariel's voice that had been written for the original film but discarded, and "One Step Closer", a new song where Eric helps Ariel express herself through dance. Eric also provides vocals in the quartet "If Only", where he expresses confusion over his attraction to Ariel, and his fear that if he finds the girl with the right voice, he might lose Ariel. A new subplot in the stage musical is a singing competition where the eligible princesses in all the land are invited to sing for Eric. The princesses perform in the song "The Contest", which is set to the tune of Ariel's song "Part of Your World." At the end of the performance, Ariel dances for Eric, and he chooses her. The role was also performed by Drew Seeley.

Eric also appears in the video game Disney Magic Kingdoms, as a playable character to unlock for a limited time.

Eric appears in The Little Mermaid Live!, played by Graham Phillips. In Rob Marshall's live-action film adaptation, Jonah Hauer-King portrays Eric.

Sebastian

Horatio Thelonious Ignacious Crustaceous Sebastian is a red Jamaican crab and a servant of king Triton, and also his main musical composer. His main song is "Under the Sea". He is voiced by Samuel E. Wright in both the films and the TV series.

The character was developed solely for the Disney film and is not derived from the original Hans Christian Andersen story. Early on in the writing and development of the film, the character was originally an English-butler lobster named Clarence; songwriter Howard Ashman proposed changing Clarence to a Jamaican Rastafari crab and shifting the music style throughout the film to reflect this. Duncan Marjoribanks served as Sebastian's supervising animator.

Wright auditioned for the role as though for a stage musical. He could not do a Trinidadian accent, so he did a Jamaican accent during his audition, which Ashman decided to keep. His physicality impressed co-director Ron Clements, who videotaped a repeat performance in order to inspire the animators.

Two reggae albums featuring Wright performing in-character as Sebastian were released under the Walt Disney Records label. The first was Sebastian From The Little Mermaid, featuring songs from The Little Mermaid, along with covers including Three Little Birds, and original tunes. The second, released in October 1991, is Sebastian: Party Gras! This consists of reggae covers of classic songs such as "Iko Iko", "Octopus's Garden", "Twist and Shout", and "What a Wonderful World", as well as a few original tunes.

In Aladdin, Sebastian has a cameo. When the Genie looks for "Royal Recipes" to transform Aladdin into a prince, he glimpses a recipe for "Alaskan king crab". Sebastian comes out of the book, pinches the Genie's finger, and a few seconds of "Under the Sea" is played. (The Genie's response, "I hate when they do that.")

Sebastian appears in the Little Mermaid Broadway musical, where he was originally played by Tituss Burgess, and has also been performed by Alan Mingo Jr. and Rodgelio Douglas Jr. He also appears in The Little Mermaid Live!, played by Shaggy.

Sebastian made an appearance in the first three titles of the Kingdom Hearts series of video games, voiced by Kevin Michael Richardson in the English version and Kōichi Yamadera in the Japanese version. He also appears in the video game Disney Magic Kingdoms, as a playable character to unlock for a limited time.

Sebastian will appear in the live-action remake of The Little Mermaid. Daveed Diggs will provide the crab's voice.

Flounder

Flounder is a yellow and blue tropical fish (despite the name, he is not a flounder) and Ariel's best friend, voiced by Jason Marin in the 1989 film, who also provided vocals in-character for the tie-in music album Sebastian From The Little Mermaid. Flounder scares easily, and is prone to panicking under stressful situations like a single shark breaching the sunken ship, but when Ariel is in trouble, he comes through for her without hesitation. In the film he is the only character (aside from Scuttle) to support Ariel's fascination with human things, and at one point gives Ariel a statue of Eric as a gift.

Flounder appears in all the episodes of the prequel television series, sharing constant adventures with Ariel and in the episode "The Evil Manta", shown how he first met Ariel when they were children. According to the television series, Flounder's real name is "Guppy Number 35." In the series, he is voiced by Edan Gross and Bradley Pierce.

Flounder also appears in Jim Henson's Little Mermaid's Island where he has a twin sister named Sandy and is voiced by Veronica Taylor.

Flounder has a small role in The Little Mermaid II: Return to the Sea, where he is reunited with a grown-up Ariel and takes part in the search for Ariel and Eric's daughter Melody. He grew up and became a father himself, with five children of his own and he first meets Melody in Morgana's lair. In this film, he is voiced by Cam Clarke.

He has a larger role in The Little Mermaid: Ariel's Beginning, which shows an alternate version of how he first meets Ariel and later unknowingly leads her to the Catfish Club. He beatboxes and initiates a reprise of "Jump In The Line (Shake, Senora)" when he, Ariel, Sebastian and the Catfish Club Band are on the run from Atlantica. In this film, he is voiced by Parker Goris.

Flounder appears in the Kingdom Hearts series, where his role as Ariel's friend remains. His biggest role in the series is in Kingdom Hearts: Chain of Memories, where Ursula kidnapped him to force Ariel to give her the trident. He also sings his part in the song called "A New Day is Dawning." He also appears in Disney Princess: Enchanted Journey as Ariel's sidekick and is voiced by Anthony Skillman. He is also a remote-controlled playable character in the same game seen holding a big conch shell on his head with your help to catch the voice orbs. Flounder also appears in the video game Disney Magic Kingdoms, as a playable character to unlock for a limited time.

At the Disney theme parks, Flounder makes cameo appearances in the Mickey's Philharmagic 3D show and in the Hong Kong Disneyland version of "It's a Small World." He has also appeared in the parks as a walk-around character, but mostly in parades, shows and special events such as "Mickey's Pirate & Princess Party".

Flounder appears in the stage adaptation of The Little Mermaid. His supporting role is similar as in the film, but he does not give Ariel the statue of Eric, and does not help Ariel reach Eric's wedding barge, as the Vanessa subplot has been removed. However, Flounder performs a new song titled "She's in Love", which he sings with Ariel's sisters when they notice that Ariel has been acting "fishy lately." The stage role was originated by Cody Hanford and J.J. Singleton, but the two actors had to leave the show when their height overshot that of Sierra Boggess, who originated Ariel. The role was taken over by Trevor Braun and Brian D'Addario. On the Original Broadway Cast Recording, Brian D'Addario performs as Flounder.

Flounder also appears as a puppet in The Little Mermaid Live!. He also makes a cameo appearance in the 2022 film Chip 'n Dale: Rescue Rangers voiced by Rachel Bloom.

Child actor Jacob Tremblay will voice Flounder in the upcoming live-action remake of the film.

Scuttle

Scuttle is a seagull and friend of Ariel, voiced by Buddy Hackett in the 1989 film and 2000 sequel. He presents himself as an expert on human objects, with whom Ariel consults about items she salvages. He refers to a fork as a "dinglehopper," and a smoking pipe as a "snarfblatt." He also provides support and advice when he learns that Ariel has to win Eric's heart in three days. On the third day, Scuttle discovers that Vanessa is actually Ursula, and immediately tells Ariel.

Scuttle appears in a small role in The Little Mermaid II: Return to the Sea, in which he helps Ariel find her daughter Melody, who has run away.

Scuttle appears in two episodes of the third season of the prequel television series in which he is voiced by Maurice LaMarche. The episodes he appears in are "Scuttle", where Ariel, Flounder and Sebastian meet him for the first time (in which he claims his name was originally "Scuttlebutt" but he changed it "for obvious reasons"), and "Island of Fear." In these episodes, Scuttle's explanation of human things is a mixture of correct and erroneous. Scuttle also made a cameo appearance in an episode of Quack Pack.

In The Little Mermaid: Songs from the Sea, Scuttle performs a song called "The Scuttle Strut" on track 3.

Scuttle appears in the stage adaptation of the original film, where he sings two songs: "Human Stuff" and "Positivity." The role is originated by Eddie Korbich. In the stage musical, Scuttle has a group of seagull friends, and together they perform a tap dance during the "Positoovity" number.

Scuttle has a non-speaking cameo in The Little Mermaid: Ariel's Beginning, appearing when Marina is on a rock at the surface (animated the same way with Ariel when she sings a reprise for "Part of Your World") and is splashed by a wave.

Scuttle also appears in the video game Disney Magic Kingdoms, as a playable character to unlock for a limited time.

A female version of Scuttle is set to appear in the live-action adaptation of The Little Mermaid. This version will be portrayed as a diving bird, in order for the character to be featured in underwater scenes. Awkwafina will voice the character in the film.

Ursula

Ursula is the main antagonist of the 1989 film. She is voiced by Pat Carroll, who also provides her vocals for all the canonical animated media. Queen Latifah plays her in The Little Mermaid Live!. Melissa McCarthy will play Ursula in the live-action film adaption. Ursula is based on the "sea witch/sorceress" character in Hans Christian Andersen's story "The Little Mermaid". In the 2007 Broadway musical, the role of Ursula was originated by Sherie Rene Scott.

King Triton

King Triton is the ruler of Atlantica who has white hair, a white beard, and a white mustache (in the prologue of prequel film he has auburn brown), husband of Queen Athena, the father of Ariel and her sisters and grandfather of Melody. The sea king is unnamed in the Hans Christian Andersen version. In the first two films, the TV series and the Kingdom Hearts games, he was voiced by Kenneth Mars; in the prequel film, he is voiced by Jim Cummings. Triton wields a powerful trident; the source of his apparently unlimited power. The character is inspired by the son of the Greek sea god Poseidon, although the actual Triton is from Greek mythology and has two finned feet.

In The Little Mermaid, Triton shows severe distaste for humans, and Ariel's fascination with them strains their relationship. Because of this, Triton orders his servant, Sebastian, to look after Ariel. When Triton discovers that Ariel has fallen in love with a human prince named Eric, he destroys her grotto and collection of human artifacts in a fit of rage. After Ariel disappears, Triton subsequently blames himself and orders a search for her to apologize, not knowing that she has accepted Ursula's deal and become a human. When Sebastian arrives with news of Ursula's scheme, he offers to take his daughter's place. Triton is transformed into a polyp by Ursula, but is restored to his original form when she is defeated by Eric. Seeing that Ariel is happy with Eric, Triton uses his trident to transform her into a human.

Triton is a regular character in the prequel television series, in which he is called by the son of Poseidon. A number of episodes show conflict between him and Ariel.

Triton appears in the sequel, The Little Mermaid II: Return To The Sea, where he meets his newborn granddaughter Melody and gifts her a necklace to show her mermaid heritage. However, after Melody's life is threatened by Ursula's sister Morgana, Ariel decides that for Melody's safety, she must not know about the sea or her mermaid heritage, meaning that she cannot have contact with Triton and the other merfolk. Triton reluctantly throws the necklace away and assigns Sebastian to watch over Melody for him. 12 years later after Melody goes out to sea, Triton turns Ariel back into a mermaid to look for her. Morgana tricks Melody into stealing Triton's trident and makes Triton and the other merfolk bow to her, but Melody (being human) is immune to the spell and takes back the trident and throws it to Triton, who defeats Morgana by trapping her in a block of ice. Triton then asks Melody if she wishes to be a mermaid permanently, but Melody instead wishes to destroy the wall that was built to stop her getting to the sea all those years ago.

In the 2008 direct-to-DVD prequel The Little Mermaid: Ariel's Beginning, Triton bans music from Atlantica after his wife Athena is crushed to death by a pirate ship. He forces everyone and the city to follow a strict daily schedule, straining his relationship with free-spirited Ariel. He eventually lifts the ban on music and appoints Sebastian as his court composer. Jim Cummings replaces Kenneth Mars as the voice of King Triton, due to Mars' pancreatic cancer diagnosis.

In the stage musical, Triton is Ursula's older brother, and the two are each given equal share of the sea and one magical item each. When Ursula began to abuse her power, Triton exiled her, though he did not take away her Nautilus shell. This stage role is originated by Norm Lewis.

In the Kingdom Hearts series of video games, Triton still plays the role of over-protective father and king of Atlantica. In the first game, his relationship with Ariel becomes strained due to his daughter's desire to see other worlds, and he initially distrusts Sora, Donald and Goofy when they first arrive in Atlantica, having somehow heard of the negative part of the Keyblade legend, but eventually respects Sora when Ursula is defeated and locks the world's keyhole. In Kingdom Hearts II, Triton's relationship with Ariel is strained, this time thanks to Ariel's fascination with the human world. He asks Sora, Donald and Goofy to take part in the music concert with Ariel, but Sora ignores Triton's request and helps Ariel become human to find and fall in love with Eric. He is also part of the song called "A New Day is Dawning." After Ursula is defeated once again, he respectfully bids a final farewell to Sora. King Triton is referenced in the film The Princess and the Frog, as a parade float during the Mardi Gras. King Triton also appears in the video game Disney Magic Kingdoms, as a playable character to unlock for a limited time.

King Triton is set to appear in the live-action adaptation of The Little Mermaid. He will be portrayed by Javier Bardem.

Attina, Alana, Adella, Aquata, Arista and Andrina

Ariel has six older sisters named Attina, Alana, Adella, Aquata, Arista and Andrina. In the 1989 film, they are voiced by Kimmy Robertson and perform the song "Daughters of Triton." Later, Attina, Andrina, Adella and Aquata make a brief appearance together with Ariel, in what appears to be the palace dressing room. In this scene, Ariel emerges from behind a curtain of seaweed swimming dreamily and hums a few lines from "Part of Your World." The sisters notice a change in Ariel's mood and conclude that Ariel is in love. All six sisters appear again in the end of the film together with Triton, smiling and waving to Ariel after she marries Eric.

In the second film, the sisters play a minor role with only Attina, Andrina, Aquata and Adella having dialogue.

Voice actors 
Attina:
Kath Soucie (TV episodes)
Christie Houser (Kingdom Hearts II)
Kari Wahlgren (prequel film)
Alana:
Kimmy Robertson (TV episodes and first film)
Jennifer Hale (prequel film)
Adella:
Kimmy Robertson (first film)
Sherry Lynn (TV episodes)
Tara Strong (prequel film)
Aquata:
Mona Marshall (TV episodes)
Grey DeLisle (prequel film)
Arista:
Kimmy Robertson (first film)
Mary Kay Bergman (TV episodes)
Grey DeLisle (prequel film)
Andrina:
Kimmy Robertson (first film)
Catherine Cavadini (TV episodes)
Susan Stevens Logan (Kingdom Hearts II)
Tara Strong (prequel film)

Glut
Glut is a ferocious great white shark and a minor antagonist of the film. He first appears where Ariel and Flounder are exploring the Sunken Ship are collecting human artifacts and pursues them trying to kill them, but somehow gets his head stuck in an anchor and was not seen again for the entire film afterwards. He makes minor appearances in the television series and also appears as a boss in Kingdom Hearts where Sora and company at first can escape fighting him, but he must be defeated later to enter Ursula's lair.

Flotsam and Jetsam

Flotsam and Jetsam are Ursula's green moray eel minions, voiced by Paddi Edwards in the 1989 film. They do Ursula's bidding and act as her spies, keeping their eye on the events unfolding in and around Atlantica. They are tasked with following Ariel and reporting her actions back to Ursula. They eventually manipulate Ariel into visiting Ursula to attain human legs. They are ultimately killed by Ursula inadvertently in the film's climax, and Ursula subsequently mourns for them.

Flotsam and Jetsam appear in the prequel television series alongside Ursula. They also appear in the Broadway stage musical, where the roles were originated by Tyler Maynard and Derrick Baskin. The eels also appear as puppets in The Little Mermaid Live!.

Grimsby

Grimsby is Eric's majordomo and confidant. He is voiced by Ben Wright in the original film. In the opening scene, Grimsby is shown as not having the stomach for the sea, and dismisses the sailors' stories about merpeople living under the sea. Through dialogue, Grimsby reveals that he worries for Eric, and has been hoping that the prince will settle down with the right girl. For Eric's birthday, Grimsby presents a statue he had commissioned of Eric in a dramatic pose. Though Eric and Max disapprove of the statue, Grimsby is proud of it. Later, when Ariel has become human, Grimsby grows fond of her and encourages Eric to give up his dream girl for one "of flesh and blood".

Grimsby appears in some scenes in the sequel, in which he is voiced by Kay E. Kuter.

In the 2007 stage musical adaptation, Grimsby says that the reason he wants Eric to marry is because he (Grimsby) had made a promise to Eric's late father to ensure it. Though Grimsby is reluctant to believe Eric's story of being saved from drowning by a girl, he comes up with the idea of holding a contest in which the princesses of the land are to sing for Eric, in the hopes that one of them will be the right girl. In the stage musical, the role is originated by Jonathan Freeman.

Grimsby also appears in The Little Mermaid Live!, played by Dominique Kelley.

Max
Max is an Old English Sheepdog and Eric's pet. Unlike all the other animals in the film, Max is minimally anthropomorphic and does not speak in the human language. Max's barking and growling is provided by Frank Welker throughout his animated incarnations.

During Eric's birthday celebration, Max catches Ariel's scent and tracks her down, licking her on the cheek in an apparent show of affection. When the ship catches fire, the sailors escape safely, but Max is left behind. Seeing this, Eric dives out of his lifeboat and climbs back on board, grabbing Max and tossing him to safety. Later, when Eric is brought to shore safely by Ariel, Max smells out his master and rushes out to greet him. Max is also able to smell Ariel who is hidden off-shore behind rocks, but Eric does not understand his barking. After Ariel has made her deal with Ursula and is brought to shore as a human, Max leads Eric to her, recognizing her as the same person, though Eric cannot. Eventually, Ursula herself appears in the guise of a human girl named Vanessa to distract Eric from kissing Ariel before the third day is up. Max is the only character in the human world who can fully see Vanessa for who she really is and is seen growling furiously at her during her and Eric's wedding, and she kicks him directly in the face. When Scuttle and the sea animals try to stop the wedding, Max assists by biting Vanessa's rear, giving Scuttle the leverage to break the conch shell containing Ariel's voice.

Max makes a few brief appearances in the prequel television series and the direct-to-video sequel, and is the only named character of the original film (other than Vanessa) who does not appear in the 2007 stage musical. Max does however appear in The Little Mermaid Live!, played by Bagel the sheepdog.

Chef Louis
Louis is the chef in Eric's castle, voiced by René Auberjonois. His accent implies that he is French, and he performs the song "Les Poissons" in which he happily cooks seafood in the castle kitchen. According to dialogue by Carlotta the house maid, Louis' specialty is stuffed crab. This puts him at odds with Sebastian, who accidentally ends up in his kitchen and frantically tries to get away from him. This rivalry is extended to the wedding in the finale, where the chef again chases Sebastian in an attempt to cut him up. The rivalry is shown again in the sequel The Little Mermaid II: Return to the Sea, with no change between the two.

He also stars in one of the episodes of Disney's Marsupilami and Raw Toonage as a noise hating hotel guest with his victim, Sebastian as the hotel manager. Louis also makes an appearance in the episode "Ariel's Treasures" where he accidentally steps on a whisk called a "whirly twirly" by Ariel and it slips into the water when he is making recipes.

In the 2007 stage musical, Louis is head of a group of chefs that work in Eric's castle. He performs the song "Les Poissons" from the original movie. A reprise is performed by Louis and all the other chefs as they present their fish masterpieces to Ariel, Eric and Grimsby. The role was originated by John Treacy Egan.

Chef Louis appears in The Little Mermaid Live!, played by John Stamos.

Carlotta
Carlotta works in Eric's castle in a role suggested to be similar to a housekeeper, though it is not stated outright. She reappears in the sequel, apparently continuing her role after Eric and Ariel are married and have a daughter of their own. She is voiced by Edie McClurg.

In the 2007 stage musical, Carlotta develops an affectionate maternal relationship with Ariel. Carlotta sings in the musical number "Beyond My Wildest Dreams", where she berates the other servants who gossip about Ariel. Near the end of the musical there is a contest where the princesses of the land are to sing for Eric, in the hope that one of them will have the voice of the girl who saved his life. The role is originated by Heidi Blickenstaff.

Television series
Urchin (voiced by Danny Cooksey) is an orphaned merboy with an olive-green tail and is one of the main characters of the prequel television series, in which he is a close friend of Ariel, Sebastian and Flounder, and often goes on adventures with them. Urchin first appears in the fourth episode of the series, "Urchin." In it, Urchin is seen to be an orphan who lives by himself and wants badly to have friends. He is approached by small-time villains Lobster Mobster and Da Shrimp, who bring him into their gang and use him to steal food for them. Urchin manages to steal food from the palace, but in doing so is confronted by Ariel. Ariel tries to befriend Urchin, who at first rebuffs her. Urchin shows his true colors when he helps Ariel escape after she is kidnapped by Lobster Mobster and Da Shrimp. He even stops Crab Louie from stealing from the royal treasury. This earns him a kiss from Ariel. A friendship is forged when Urchin follows Ariel's advice and apologises to King Triton for his behavior. In the episode "Trident True", Urchin plays pranks on Ariel's sisters Arista, Attina, Andrina and Adella and buys a Father's Day present for King Triton, implying his closeness with the royal family, and Ariel's sisters admit that they look on him as their own little brother.
Gabriella is one of Ariel's friends. She is a deaf mermaid with a pink tail and matching shells who communicates with sign language. She appears in two episodes: "Wish Upon a Starfish" and "Ariel's Treasures". In her first appearance, before she meets Ariel, she sees her singing the first part of a song called "Daring to Dance" and sees her twirling about a music box with a figure of a ballerina on top of it. Ariel stops abruptly upon seeing her, but Gabriella encourages her to continue. She wishes to be able to sing as beautifully as Ariel, and she identifies with Ariel's desire to dance. She decides to journey with Ariel to visit the Magical Wishing Starfish, passing through many dangers along the way. She is saddened when the Magical Wishing Starfish proves to be a fraud, but Ariel reassures her that she can express her feelings just as well through sign language. She joins Ariel in the second part of "Daring to Dance." In her second appearance, she returns to Atlantica for a visit. She and Ariel gush over Ariel's new additions to her collection of human objects, as well as the music box that Ariel found when they first met. Unbeknownst to either of them, Ursula has launched another scheme to take over Atlantica, this time casting a spell that causes Ariel's treasures to come to life and terrorize people. She is confused and shocked when the treasures come alive, but she works with Ariel to break Ursula's spell.
Ollie (voiced by Whitby Hertford) is a blue vocal octopus who appears in two episodes: "Wish Upon a Starfish" and "Ariel's Treasures." He is the close friend and interpreter of Gabriella, a mute mermaid. He has spots on the sides of his head and a patch on his left eye. In his first appearance, he is shown with Gabriella, watching Ariel sing. After Ariel notices them, he explains Gabriella's disability and introduces himself. He is also the one to tell the tale of the Magical Wishing Starfish, and he accompanies them along the way. In his second appearance, he is visiting Atlantica with Gabriella and helps her stop Ursula's plot to take over the kingdom.
Pearl (voiced by Cree Summer) is a fun-loving mermaid with a blue tail and matching shells who is familiar with Ariel and Alana. She is blonde, with a blue tail and blue, ruffle-edged shells. She makes her first appearance in episode "Red" at a party held by Ariel, arriving with a crowd of friends on "squid-cycles." She is apparently very popular and seems friendly, if a bit snobbish. She comments that the party is a bit dull, and Ariel requests that the live band play louder, against her father's instructions. She leaves with the other guests when Triton puts a halt to the party. In her second appearance in episode "Eel-ectric City", she shows up at the palace to pick up Alana, who has been invited to a party at her house. Ariel is shocked and impressed when Pearl comments that her parents allow her to do as she pleases, and is invited to join them. As they are leaving, Pearl spies Triton's new chariot and coerces Ariel into driving the three mermaids in it while she gives directions. After a few minutes, Alana notes that they are not heading for Pearl's house; they are instead going to Eel-ectric City, a party town reminiscent of Las Vegas, where Pearl is going to meet a few friends. They arrive and are having a fairly good time until a gang known as the "Orange Roughies" shows up. Pearl taunts them, then challenges them to a chariot race. Ariel and Alana try to reason with Pearl, but she wants to see the race through to the end. They start the race, but quickly lose control of the chariot in the rush of the current. It is only Ariel's quick thinking and the timely appearance of Triton that saves them. Pearl is shocked that her parents bothered coming, but happy that they cared about her. Her mother states that she will be keeping a closer eye on her daughter from now on. 
Spot is a fun-loving killer whale calf whose name is based on a single white spot which is birthmarked on his tail. In the episode called "Whale of a Tale", when the human poachers get nearby, he frightenedly swims away from his real family until Ariel encounters him with a little love. She cares for him until she lets him go to be with his real family. He returns in "Save the Whale" as a grown-up whale and, as Sebastian announces him, he excitedly begins to perform for the citizens of Atlantica until he gets caught.
Simon (voiced by Brian Cummings) is a sea dragon. Imprisoned in cave and looking to be rescued. Simon writes a message and puts it in a bottle and with some luck, Ariel, Sebastian, and Flounder find the letter, brave danger en route to the cave, and then they face a giant sea dragon. The dragon turns out to be Simon himself, the writer of the message, who's looking to have a party with some new friends. Bringing Simon home to King Triton poses another challenge until Simon helps King Triton to save Atlantica and its merpeople from an invasion of evil sea anemones.
Dudley is an elderly sea turtle who also serves somewhat of an assistant to King Triton besides Sebastian. Dudley mumbles when he speaks and does not swim like other sea turtles in real life, instead he walks slowly along the sea floor like a land turtle and keeps important documents within his shell when he retracts his head. His conversation is always interrupted by his employer as he understands what the former is about to say.
Archimedes (voiced by Rod McKuen) is a merman scholar, explorer and adventurer who is fascinated with humans, particularly human objects, like Ariel, he wants to know as much about the human world as possible, because of his fascination with humans, he is ostracized and disliked by his own people, as his only friend is Ariel. Because Archimedes goes to the surface very often, his knowledge on human culture is far more accurate than Ariel's; prior to the latter becoming human herself and her marriage to Eric. Due to Archimedes being ostracized by the merpeople, he lives in an abandoned sunken ship, in the wilderness outside of Atlantica, is also where he keeps his collection of human objects, initially, unlike Ariel, he has directly met humans and has even interacted with them.
Hans Christian Andersen, the author of the original Little Mermaid fairy tale appears in the episode "Metal Fish." He is voiced by Mark Hamill. Based on rumors he hears from other sailors about the existence of merfolk, he attempts verify these claims by exploring the undersea world with the invention of his primitive submarine. While exploring the undersea world, his sub springs a leak and his steering controls are affected causing his sub to lose control and eventually sink to the bottom. However, to his surprise he encounters Ariel, to which his claims are verified. Later on, Archimedes, Sebastian, Flounder, The Crabscouts, and even King Triton appear to assist Andersen's damaged vessel back to the surface. At the end of this episode, the character is inspired by the encounter to "write" the story of The Little Mermaid. This encounter contradicts the idea that Ariel's first face to face contact with humans is with Prince Eric, and forces Ariel to confront her father with the fact that she, Triton, and all merfolk are half human when she appeals to Triton for help in saving Andersen's life.
Lobster Mobster and Da Shrimp (voiced by Joe Alaskey and David Lander) are a lobster and shrimp duo who are bumbling con-artists and constantly antagonize Ariel and her friends and are recurring antagonists from the television series. They are modeled after the stereotypes of the gangsters from the 1920s.
Manta (voiced by Tim Curry) is a recurring villain in the TV series. Although his exact age is unknown, he appears to be potentially ageless as an individual is referenced in a legend as nearly destroying Atlantica who was imprisoned in an undersea volcano many years before the time of the series. The character is freed from an undersea volcano by a well-meaning Ariel. He then became a recurring character, intent on taking control of Atlantica for himself. He later has a son, "Little Evil" who becomes a friend of Ariel's, resulting in his father's redemption.
Howling Hairfish are monstrous fish, analogous to a werewolf. Flounder is the only Howling Hairfish that speaks.
Stormy is a wild giant seahorse. Ariel once tried to ride him despite her father's warnings in the series, but then after the mermaid's accident, Stormy had to be released back into the wild where he is much happier.

The Little Mermaid II: Return to the Sea

Melody

Melody is the daughter of Eric and Ariel, the niece of Ariel's sisters and the granddaughter of King Triton and Queen Athena. She is also the princess of her father's kingdom.

The film opens to the celebration of her birth; her parents sail out to sea to present Melody to King Triton and the merfolk. As Triton gives her the locket, the celebration is interrupted by Morgana, who threatens to hurt Melody if Triton does not hand over the trident. Eric and Ariel manage to save Melody, but Morgana escapes. Ariel vows to keep all knowledge of the sea from Melody until Morgana is found.

By her 12th birthday, Melody has been regularly sneaking out of the palace to swim. She finds the locket, and questions Ariel about it. Ariel and Melody argue, and before Ariel can apologize and explain, Melody runs away from the castle in a boat. Melody is discovered by Morgana's shark Undertow and convinced to meet Morgana, who uses Melody's love of the sea against her. Morgana transforms Melody into a mermaid, promising that the transformation will last forever if she retrieves the trident from Triton.

Melody succeeds in stealing the trident and gives it to Morgana, who subsequently traps her in a cave. Soon afterward, Morgana's spell on Melody wears off, causing her to revert into a human and nearly drowns. Melody sneaks up behind Morgana and stabs her with the trident, before giving it to Triton, who encases Morgana in ice.

In the wake of their victory, Triton offers Melody the option of becoming a mermaid permanently but Melody declines. Instead, she decides to destroy the wall that separates the sea from her home with the Trident to reunite the land and sea once again.

Melody performs one song in the film, "For a Moment", in which Ariel, voiced by Jodi Benson, also provides vocals.

She is also a playable character in the PlayStation game, The Little Mermaid II, based on the two movies.

She is voiced by Tara Strong.

Although Return to the Sea received mostly negative reviews for its plot, Melody was generally considered the highlight of the film and earned praise for her character growth, likability, and Tara Strong's performance.

Morgana

Morgana is the younger sister of Ursula and is also half octopus. She has three minions; a tiger shark named Undertow, and a pair of manta rays called Cloak and Dagger.

She attacks Melody during her first birth celebration and uses her as a hostage to gain Triton's trident. Morgana eventually meets twelve-year-old Melody, who she asks to retrieve the trident for her. After attaining the trident and proclaiming herself the new ruler of the seas, Triton helps Melody defeat Morgana.

Like Ursula, Morgana is voiced by Pat Carroll.

Tip and Dash

Tip and Dash are supporting characters in The Little Mermaid II: Return to the Sea and friends of Melody. Tip is an emperor penguin voiced by Max Casella, and Dash is a walrus voiced by Stephen Furst. Their names are derived from the convention of Morse Code which uses dots (or "tips") and dashes to communicate messages. They are based on Timon and Pumbaa from Disney's The Lion King. 

In the film, Tip and Dash are established odd couple best friends whom Melody encounters when she has been transformed into a mermaid. Tip and Dash join Melody on her journey to retrieve the trident for Morgana. In the final battle, both characters find their inner courage and help to save the day.

The duo perform the song "Tip and Dash" with Melody.

Undertow

Undertow, voiced by Clancy Brown, is a minion of Morgana.

He is initially a large purple and black colored tiger shark, before being transformed into a piranha by Triton. Undertow convinces Melody to visit Morgana, who, upon attaining the Trident restores him to his original form.

Cloak and Dagger

Cloak and Dagger are dark blue manta rays and Morgana's henchmen. They do speak. They were voiced by Dee Bradley Baker

Ursula and Morgana's Mother
Unnamed Ursula and Morgana's Mother, is a widow witch. She loved Ursula more than Morgana. Morgana mentions her many times in The Little Mermaid II.

The Little Mermaid: Ariel's Beginning

Queen Athena

Athena was Triton's wife, queen of Atlantica, and the mother of Ariel, Aquata, Andrina, Arista, Attina, Adella and Alana. Her speaking voice is provided by Lorelei Hill Butters, and her singing voice is provided by Andrea Robinson. She appears in the opening prologue of the prequel, in which she is at first shown singing her and Triton's special song (Athena's song) to the girls before bedtime. She is then seen relaxing in a cove on the ocean surface with her husband, children and other merfolk. Triton gives her a music box that plays their song as an anniversary present. The fun ceases when a pirate ship appears and attacks the merpeople, during which Athena is crushed to death by the ship, whilst trying to save the music box. Triton responds to this tragedy by banning music from Atlantica. Prior to this film, Ariel's mother had been mentioned before in the prequel television series, but had then remained nameless. It is never actually stated, but it is quite likely that it was Athena's death, at the hands of humans, that caused Triton's prejudice towards them.

The character will reportedly appear in the live-action film adaptation of The Little Mermaid, with the film also focusing on Ariel and her mother's relationship.

Marina Del Rey

Marina Del Rey, voiced by Sally Field, is a mermaid and the governess of King Triton's seven daughters, in charge of enforcing Triton's distant and formal parenting style and is the main villainess. She feels she has been stuck as the governess for too long, and her primary motivation is to take over Sebastian's job as the king's attaché. She temporarily succeeds after getting Sebastian, Flounder, and their secret music band sent to prison (as music was forbidden from Atlantica at the time) but upon learning of the gang's escape with Ariel, Marina resolves to kill them all by sending her electric eels after them. Marina is eventually caught, and Triton sends her to a lifetime imprisonment for her crimes.

Benjamin

Benjamin is a light green manatee and Marina's sidekick. Unlike Marina, Benjamin is a softy who loves Ariel and her sisters, and wishes Marina would be nice. He is voiced by Jeff Bennett.

Catfish Club Band

The Catfish Club Band are a quartet house band in the Catfish Club, the underground music club in Atlantica that exists in opposition to King Triton's ban on music. Their bandleader and vocalist is Sebastian, who also plays maracas. Other members are Ray-Ray, a sky-blue manta ray who plays the bass, voiced by Kevin Michael Richardson; Cheeks, a green blowfish who plays the saxophone, voiced by Kevin Michael Richardson; Ink Spot, a violet octopus who plays the piano, voiced by Rob Paulsen; Shelbow, a teal sea turtle who plays the drums, voiced by Jim Cummings.

Other
The Seahorse is King Triton's herald, master-of-ceremonies, and messenger. He appears in the 1989 film as well as the TV series and the sequel.
Gertrude is mentioned by one of the maids who are washing clothes.

References

 
Lists of Disney animated film characters
Lists of characters in American television animation